Aleksandar Filimonović is a Serbian-American film and television actor, writer and producer best known for his roles in the films Dolemite Is My Name, White Lions and Montevideo, and in the television series Gaslit, S.W.A.T., The Americans, NCIS, My father's killers, Ravna gora, Village is burning..., and others.

Personal life 
Aleksandar has lived in Belgrade, Moscow, London, New York and Los Angeles, and is fluent in English, Russian and Serbian. Before attending Lee Strasberg Theatre and Film Institute he attained a BSc in Computer Science from Royal Holloway, University of London and has graduated from IV Belgrade Gymnasium before that. He is also a member of MENSA high-iq society.

Other than acting, Aleksandar has been involved in many different sports, including soccer (at FK Rad youth team and later University of London All-star team), he also had a STARS (Student Talented Athlete Recognition Scheme) scholarship at Royal Holloway; He practices Shotokan Karate, in which he trained with Masataka Mori and James Field, he holds a black-belt; aikido, in which he trained with Mirko Jovandić and Yoshimitsu Yamada; XMA (eXtreme Martial Arts), with Mike Chat; and quite a few other sports, including snowboarding, waterskiing, ice-skating, horseback riding, sky-diving, volleyball, tennis, speedboat, jetski, motorcycle and car racing.

He also plays guitar, piano and sings - he is a bass-baritone. Aleksandar also studied Latin and ballroom dancing with Paul Pellicoro.

Known for his humanitarian attitude, Aleksandar is a member of the Red Cross, where he is a lifeguard and was involved in multiple rescue operations during the catastrophic 2014 Balkan floods. He has also saved a lady's life on an intercontinental flight in the spring of 2018.

Acting education 
Before moving to New York to attend the Lee Strasberg Theatre and Film Institute, Aleksandar was a member of Mika Aleksić's acting studio (Thing of the Heart) in Belgrade. At Lee Strasberg he studied under many renowned acting teachers, including Hope Arthur, George Loros, Paul Calderón, Robert Ellerman, Anna Strasberg, Irma Sandrey, Geoffrey Horne, Ted Zurkowski, Pennie DuPont, Jeffrey Ferguson, Bruce Baumer, Jan Douglas, Chris Lutkin, Michael Ryan, Kohli Calhoun, John van Wyden, Allen Suddeth, Robert Castle and Richard Larson.

Filmography

Film

Television

References

External links 
 
 Aleksandar Filimonović - official website

Living people
Male actors from Belgrade
Serbian male film actors
Serbian male television actors
Year of birth missing (living people)